Jason Leong (born 23 January 1985) is a Malaysian comedian and author.

Early life 
Jason originally studied medicine in University College, Dublin, Ireland. He worked as a doctor in Selayang Hospital, juggling his career in medicine and comedy. He eventually gave up medicine to focus on being a full time stand-up comedian in 2014.

Career

Comedy 

He first found fame as a member of comedy troupe The Malaysian Association of Chinese Comedians, otherwise known as MACC. The troupe consisted of him, Douglas Lim, Phoon Chi Ho and Kuah Jenhan.

In 2013, Jason became the first Malaysian to win the 7th International Hong Kong Comedy Competition.

In 2018, Leong toured his show Harmful When Swallowed in Malaysia, Singapore, India, the Philippines, Hong Kong and Australia.

In 2020, Netflix released Leong's first special on the platform Dr. Jason Leong: Hashtag Blessed on 16 September. The special was originally filmed in 2018, at Temple Of Fine Arts in Brickfields.

In 2022, Leong was selected to perform at the Just for Laughs Comedy Festival in Montreal, Canada. He was one of ten names selected for their New Faces: International showcase, being the only South-East Asian on the lineup that year.

In 2023, Netflix released Leong's second special on the platform Dr. Jason Leong: Ride with Caution on 9 February. The special was filmed in Singapore.

Writing 
In 2007, Jason published his first book The Twisted Stethoscope with Marshall Cavendish.

Filmography

Television

See also
 Ken Jeong

References

External links 

 
 

Malaysian comedians
1985 births
Living people